Altay Hajiyev (2 April 1931 – 12 February 2019) was an Azerbaijani painter, people's Artist of the Republic of Azerbaijan.

Early life 
Altay Hajiyev was born on April 2, 1931 in the family of artist Amir Hajiyev. In 1951 he graduated from the art school called Azim Azimzade and also graduated from the Kiev State Art Institute in 1959. He has participated in international and national exhibitions since 1959. In 1960, he was admitted to the Union of Artists of the USSR. Between the years 1962-1967, he worked as the chief painter of the state Press Committee of the Azerbaijan SSR Council of Ministers. He was honored as an honorary artist in 1982 and a folk artist in 2002. He was awarded the Humay Award in 1995. Altay Hajiyev has been Presidential scholarship since 2003. Several individual exhibitions of the artist were held. Graphic work was organized in 1987, In 1991,  "Natavan-Shusha ", in 2001, the "stars of our people " were thematic, as well as the 75th jubilee exhibitions in 2006. The artist's work is protected at Azerbaijan National Art Museum, Azerbaijan State Art Gallery, foreign museums and prestigious personal collections. During his work at "Azerneshr", he gets acquainted with well-known writers and poets of the time and learns their creativity. He was spending for a long time together among the famous artists. He acquired a special place in the art world and signed of himself.

Altay Haciyev's creativity attracts attention with its distinctive features. When he was studying in Ukraine, he learned the traditions of classical European painting. At the same time, he has always had an oriental sense of creativity and he also benefited from the rich traditions of the fine arts of Azerbaijan. Thus, the subject of the work, artistic content of the idea, original style, composition arrangement, color resolution parallel to the two aspects of creativity, we can observe the artistic synthesis.
Altay Hajiyev spent a lot of time on the development of book graphics. He made various works of art and painted many works. The artist has also created many series. After graduating from his higher education, he returned to his homeland and saw the construction and reconstruction work in Baku in the 60s and the level of industrialised industrial cities of Baku and created the first series called "New Baku ". The new series, titled  "Caspian ",  "pearl of the Sea " and  "The owner of the Caspian Sea", allows us to analyse the first stage of the artist's creative activity. Altay Hajiyev was not alone with the graphics of the book and tested the brush in the field of painting. The main line of painting work is the glorification of our glorious past, the historical personalities and the rich spiritual treasures.From the series "Khalgimizin Ulduzlari" "Tomris ",  "Mahsati Ganjavi ", the works are remarkable,  "Sara Khatun ",  "Khurshudbanu natavan ",  "Tuti bika ",  "Ashig Pari ",  "Aga Bayim Aga " and others.

Awards 
 Honorary Decree of the Presidium of the Supreme Soviet of the Azerbaijan SSR – 1968
 Honorary Artist of the Azerbaijan SSR - December 1, 1982
 "World of Fuzuli-500". Humay Award – 1995
 Open Society Institute Prize for Artistic Design of the Best Children's Book – 1999
 Honorary title of "People's Artist of the Republic of Azerbaijan" - May 30, 2002
 Personal pension of the President of the Republic of Azerbaijan - December 23, 2004

References 

20th-century Azerbaijani painters
21st-century Azerbaijani painters
2019 deaths
1931 births
Artists from Baku
People's Artists of Azerbaijan